Alyssa Rubino is a Canadian singer featured on the cover of Billboard.  She is from Woodbridge, Ontario.  Among her hits are "Keep On Dancing", which went on sale February 1, 2011 on iTunes and Amazon.com.  Her debut album will be entitled Every Girl's World.

Notes

External links 

In the Spotlight with Alyssa Rubino

1990s births
Living people
People from Vaughan
Musicians from Ontario
Rubino, Alyssa
21st-century Canadian women singers